Swinton railway station may refer to:

Swinton railway station (Greater Manchester), in the Metropolitan Borough of Salford
Swinton railway station (South Yorkshire), which opened in 1991 in Swinton, in the Metropolitan Borough of Rotherham
Swinton Town railway station, an earlier station north of the present station in Swinton, South Yorkshire, closed in 1968